The Hawthorne Caballeros, sponsored by American Legion Post #199 in Hawthorne, New Jersey, is a drum and bugle corps entering their 76th season of competition.

They have won the Drum Corps Associates (DCA) World Championship 10 times, the American Legion National Title 16 times, the National Dream Contest 17 times, and the New Jersey State American Legion Title 43 times. They have completed 5 undefeated seasons, consecutively in 1984 and 1985. They have placed in the Top 3 at the DCA World Championship 36 times in 56 appearances.

History

Founding years (1946-1966) 
On March 20, 1946, the Caballeros were officially organized by a small group of recent veterans, former members of the St. George Cadets, including Jim Costello, his brother Bob, future brother-in law John McAuliffe  Joe Scarber, and George Hayek. A few short weeks later, the corps made its first appearance.

In August of 1947, the Caballeros attended their first National American Legion Championship contest at Randall's Island Stadium in New York City, and placed eighth. In 1948, the corps attended the Nationals in Miami, finishing fifth; but a year later, they were disqualified because they had not finished in the top ten at the 1949 Nationals in Philadelphia. A month later, however, after regrouping and putting in some extra practice sessions, the Caballeros won their first Legion State Championship at Wildwood, New Jersey over the Jersey Joes of Riverside, the 1948 National Champions.

The Caballeros developed into a first rate contender, to which 1951 proved to be a pivotal year. The Caballeros went on to win their first Legion National Championship. While in Miami, were offered a trip to Havana by the State Department, which was declined. The Caballeros would win the Legion National Championship in 1953, 1954, and attained a seven year winning streak from 1958 to 1964. By the discontinuing of the American Legion Championship in 1980, the Caballeros had won 15 times. After the 1958 Nationals, the Caballeros accepted another offer to tour Havana.

Transition to DCA 
In the late fifties and early sixties, there was a growing consensus among drum corps in rejecting the Legion Nationals as a legitimate championship, primarily because for more years than not, the contest was held in a distant city; generally convenient for Legionnaires attending the convention, but not for drum & bugle corps based in the Northeast. Unfortunately, the drum corps championship was one small event in the overall Legion convention, and most of the top corps, including the Caballeros, often found it difficult to make the considerable expenditure in money and time to attend an event in cities such as Los Angeles, Portland, or New Orleans. The logistics and costs involved in transporting and housing a large corps over such distances was simply far greater than it was worth, often taking a year or longer to recover from financially. In addition to the financial burden on corps in general, the Legion rules were based largely on military concepts and styles. As the war years faded further and further into history and senior corps became increasingly staffed with non-veterans, there was a general feeling that the Legion's rigid competition rules had become outdated and overly restrictive. 

Frustrations which existed mainly from these two situations gave birth in 1965 to Drum Corps Associates (DCA), a sanctioning body founded by drum corps people to be focused on, and devoted exclusively to senior drum & bugle corps competition.

The Caballeros would continue to attend the Legion National Championships until the final championship in 1980, which the Caballeros won.

DCA years (1966-present) 
A member of DCA since 1966, the Caballeros have fielded a finalist corps every year since. The corps would be the first to distinguish themselves with a winning streak, winning DCA championships thrice from 1973 to 1975. In 1984 and 1985, the Caballeros completed two undefeated seasons. In 1989, during the DCA's twenty-fifth anniversary celebration, fans voted the Caballeros as their all-time favorite drum and bugle corps. In 2002, the corps would place outside of the top five for the first time in 34 years. The corps would place its lowest in recent years with the 2005 season. However, the corps would climb back into the top five in subsequent years, but fall back out top five for the 2018 season. In 2020, with the growing threat of COVID-19, the Caballeros would not perform a season for the first time since its founding. In 2021, the Caballeros completed an undefeated championship season. The Caballeros have won ten championships, the most recent being in 2021.

Show summary 1951-2021 
Source:

DCA championship seasons

1970
Score: 82.775

Repertoire: Captain From Castile / Ted Meets Johnny / Sabre Dance (from Gayne Ballet) / 1812 Overture / Samba de Orpheo

1972
Score: 90.600

Repertoire: El Gato Montes / Captain From Castile / Theme from Patton / Everybody's Everything / Sabre Dance (from Gayne Ballet) / Cha Cha Cha Flamenco / Samba de Orpheo

1973
Score: 89.850

Repertoire: Man of La Mancha / South Rampart Street Parade / Everybody's Everything / Sabre Dance (from Gayne Ballet) / Cha Cha Cha Flamenco / Harmonica Man

1974
Score: 83.500

Repertoire: Man of La Mancha / Sweet Gypsy Rose / Soul Train / Mac Arthur Park / Cha Cha Cha Flamenco / Harmonica Man

1976
Score: 92.500

Repertoire: Bully / Brazil (from The Gang's All Here) / Echano (from Children of Sanchez) / Cha Cha Cha Flamenco / Hill Where the Lord Hides

1984
Score: 92.400

Concierto de Aranjuez / Nothing But D. Best / Malaguena / Don't Cry for Me Argentina (from Evita)

1985
Score: 92.500

Repertoire: Corre Nina / Upstart / Malaguena / L.A. Is My Lady / España Cani

1995
Score: 97.700

Repertoire: Malaguena / Conquistador / Spanish Fantasy / Concierto de Aranjuez / España Cani

2003
Score: 97.375

Repertoire: El Toro Rojo (from El Toro Nuevo) / The Prayer / El Toro Furioso (from El Toro Nuevo)  

Additional Notes: The 2003 season led to the Caballeros' 9th DCA World Championship and 16th American Legion National Championship. The show's music was written by Key Poulan with percussion by Gary Gill. The drill was designed by Rich Templin. Entitled El Toro Nuevo, it was divided into three separate movements: El Toro Rojo, The Prayer and El Toro Furioso. Both the first and third movements were original compositions while The Prayer was an arrangement of the award-winning song popularized by Celine Dion and Andrea Bocelli. Notable highlights of the show included a formation of a sombrero during the soprano cadenza in the first movement and a "water drum" feature leading into the third movement. The season was a nearly undefeated one as the only loss came in East Providence, RI to the 4-time defending champions Syracuse Brigadiers by 0.3 points. A few weeks later, the Caballeros succeeded in breaking the Brigadiers historic winning streak in West Haven, CT. 2003 was also the last season under the baton of Jimmy Russo who had been drum major of the Caballeros for 33 years.

2021 
Title : At the End of the Tunnel

Score: 94.650

Repertoire: Arrival of the Birds / Oscillation / Milonga del Angel / Renewal

Traditions

Uniform and show design 
A primary goal of the newly formed corps was to be different from all the others. The concept of Latin, or Spanish style uniform was agreed upon and the corps appeared for the first time in the trademark Caballero uniform competing in their first field competition in Trenton, New Jersey on July 20, 1947. Jim Costello's father, the late James Sr., was responsible for the design, largely inspired by a small corps in San Raphael, California with a similar uniform.

Many elements combine to make up the huge impact that the Caballeros have on an audience. The compelling high caliber of performance is certainly a primary ingredient, as is  driving Latin-style music, and horn lines and percussion arrangements. From the beginning, however, the one facet that has "sold" the Caballeros show, that has brought it all together more than any other single visual feature, is that uniform. More of a costume than a uniform, it consists of a black sombrero, a white satin shirt with bloused sleeves, a bright red satin sash, black bell bottom pants with large red pleats on the sides that open and sway as the corps moves through its patterns; black shoes, and white gloves. The uniform has remained virtually unchanged all these years; testimony to a timeless design. It is one of the corps' most notable trademarks.

"The Rumps" 
Another trademark is the short, but dramatic introduction and finale that have been played in one form or another for nearly thirty years. Undoubtedly the most recognized theme music in all of drum corps, it can still be heard in subtle form in the corps' 1996 presentation. España Cani, played in its entirety beginning in 1957 and as an off-the-line introduction for many years thereafter, was originally arranged by Al Mura, and has been affectionately known through the years to corps members and their many fans as "The Rumps".

The Hawthorne Muchachos 
The Hawthorne Muchachos, the Caballeros' famous junior corps, was formed in 1959 by the renowned Caballero drum major, Ralph Silverbrand. The impetus for forming the corps was primarily to extend the great world of drum corps to younger players in Hawthorne and surrounding communities, but a secondary benefit was to create a ready pool of talent which would eventually "graduate" into the Caballeros once members reached the age of twenty-two and "aged out" of the junior corps. The Muchachos wore the same basic uniform as the senior corps except for minor trim differences, and shared the instruction staff and rehearsal facilities with the Caballeros

The Muchachos were instantly successful, totally dominating the entry-level circuit they initially competed in with two undefeated seasons their first two years out. From there they moved into a more challenging circuit.

One of the most popular and sought after junior corps, the Muchachos were eventually a member of DCI, the top junior circuit, and placed as high as fourth in 1974, a considerable achievement, given the incredible competition within that organization. Unfortunately, the Hawthorne Muchachos were disqualified during the 1975 season due to allowing an over-aged snare drummer to participate in their program. After a placement of 21st in the 1976 season the corps folded.

The Hawthorne Caballeros Alumni Drum & Bugle Corps 
The Caballeros have maintained a strong alumni association for many years. In 1994, the Association spawned another unit, the Caballeros Alumni Drum & Bugle Corps. Organized by a small but enthusiastic group of former corps members, the Alumni Corps quickly grew and continues to grow, currently numbering close to one-hundred members. The corps has been in great demand from the start, but unlike the competition corps, the Alumni Corps maintains a somewhat less rigorous schedule, and is strictly an exhibition and parade corps.

In addition to assisting the competition corps wherever and whenever possible, one of the purposes for launching the Alumni Corps was to return to some of the great music from the fifties, sixties and seventies; bringing back memories for older players and fans, and exposing younger fans to the music that made the Caballeros famous in earlier years.

Unlike other so-called "alumni" corps which are open to anyone, membership in the Caballeros Alumni Corps is open only to former playing members of the competition corps.

Famous alumni
James Russo: Drum major of the Caballeros for 33 years before his retirement in 2003. Inducted into the World Drum Corps Hall of Fame in 1993.

Frank Ponzo: Lead soprano and soloist, formerly a member of the Long Island Sunrisers, switched affiliation to the "Cabs" after the 1989 DCA season. Inducted into the Buglers Hall of Fame in 2005, the New Jersey Drum & Bugle Corps Hall of Fame in 2006, and the World Drum Corps Hall of Fame in 2014.

Louie Storck: Former drum major and staff coordinator of the Caballeros, World Drum Corps Hall of Fame member.

Chris Bernotas: Former member, soloist, arranger and brass captain head. World-renowned band composer.

References

External links
 Official Site
 History of the corps
 Hawthorne Caballeros historical scores
 Hawthorne Caballeros historical repertoires
 Drum Corps Associates

Drum Corps Associates corps
Hawthorne, New Jersey
1946 establishments in New Jersey
Musical groups established in 1946
Musical groups from New Jersey